Worth Forest is an electoral division of West Sussex in the United Kingdom, and returns one member to sit on West Sussex County Council.

Extent
The division covers the villages of Ardingly, Balcombe, Copthorne, Handcross, Pease Pottage and Turners Hill.

It comprises the following Mid Sussex District wards: Ardingly & Balcombe Ward, Copthorne & Worth Ward, and the south part of Crawley Down & Turners Hill Ward; and the following civil parishes: Ardingly, Balcombe, the north part of Slaugham, Turners Hill and the west part of Worth.

Election results

2013 Election
Results of the election held on 2 May 2013:

2009 Election
Results of the election held on 4 June 2009:

2005 Election
Results of the election held on 5 May 2005:

References
Election Results - West Sussex County Council

External links
 West Sussex County Council
 Election Maps

Electoral Divisions of West Sussex